Bricius most often refers to Bricius de Douglas, bishop of Moray (died 1222).

Bricius or Brice may also refer to:

People

Given name (Bricius)
 Bricius of Tours also known as Saint Brice of Tours (c. 370–444), Roman saint, fourth Bishop of Tours

Given name (Brice)
 Brice Aka (born 1983), Ivorian footballer
 Brice Armstrong (1936–2020), American anime voice actor 
 Brice Assie (born 1983), Ivorian basketball player
 Brice Beckham (born 1976), American actor
 Brice Blanc (born 1973), French jockey
 Brice Bosnich, Australian inorganic chemist
 Brice Catherin (born 1981), French composer and cellist
 Brice Disque (1879–1960), American soldier
 Brice Dja Djédjé (born 1990), Ivorian football player
 Brice Feillu (born 1985), French cyclist
 Brice Herbert Goldsborough (1889–1927), American aviator
 Brice Guidon (born 1985), French kickboxer
 Brice Guyart (born 1981), French fencer
 Brice Hortefeux (born 1958), French politician
 Brice Hunter (1974–2004), American football player
 Brice Jovial (born 1984), French footballer
 Brice Lalonde (born 1946), French politician
 Brice Leverdez (born 1986), French badminton player
 Brice Long (born 1971), American country music singer
 Brice McCain (born 1986), American football player
 Brice Mack (1917–2008), background painter and director at Disney 
 Brice Marden (born 1938), American artist
 Brice Matthieussent (born 1950), French literary translator
 Brice Mutton (1890–1949), Australian politician
 Brice Owona (born 1989), Cameroonian football player
 Brice Panel (born 1983), French sprinter
 Brice Parain (1897–1971), French philosopher and essayist
 Brice Stratford (theatre director) (born 1987), English actor and director
 Brice Stratford (historian) (fl. from 2017), British historian
 Brice Taylor (1902–1974), American footballer
 Brice Tirabassi (born 1977), French rally driver
 Brice Vounang (born 1982), Cameroonian basketball player
 Brice Wiggins, American attorney and politician

Middle name
 C. Brice Ratchford (1920–1997), president of the University of Missouri 
 Guy Brice Parfait Kolélas (1959–2021), Congolese politician
 Severin Brice Bikoko, Camroonian football player

Family name
 Alfred Brice (1871–1938), Welsh international rugby union player
 Anastacia Brice, American entrepreneur, business coach
 Andrew Brice (1690–1773), English printer and writer
 Antoine Brice (1752–1817), Belgian painter
 Austin Brice (born 1992), American baseball player
 Benjamin Brice (1809–1892), lawyer and soldier who served in the United States Army during the Black Hawk War and Mexican–American War
 Calvin Brice (1845–1898), American politician from Ohio
 Carol Brice (1918–1985), American contralto singer
 Edward Brice or Bryce (c. 1569–1636), Scottish Presbyterian minister
 Elizabeth Brice, later Elizabeth Amadas, mistress of Henry VIII of England
 Elizabeth Brice, a therapeutic cannabis activist who wrote as Clare Hodges 
 Fanny Brice (1891–1951), American model, comedian, singer, theater and film actress
 Fiona Brice, English composer, orchestral arranger and violinist
 Fred Brice (1887–1967), American football, basketball and baseball coach
 Gary Brice (born 1948), Australian rules football player
 Gordon Brice (1924–2003), English cricketer and footballer
 Ignace Brice (1795–1866), Belgian painter
 James Brice (1746–1801), American planter, lawyer, and politician from Maryland
 John Brice, Jr. (1705–1766), early American settler and Loyalist politician in colonial Maryland
 John Brice III (1738–1820), American lawyer, businessman and political leader from Maryland
 John J. Brice (1842–1912), United States Navy officer, U.S. Commissioner of Fish and Fisheries (1896–1898)
 Lauren Brice, pornographic actress
 Lee Brice (born 1979), American country music singer
 Liz May Brice, English actress
 Pierre Brice (1929–2015)), French actor
 Pierre-François Brice (1714–1794), French artist 
 Rachel Brice, American contemporary performer and dancer
 Russell Brice (born 1952), New Zealand mountaineer
 Sally Brice-O'Hara, American coast guard admiral
 Sian Brice (born 1969), British triathlete
 Stan Brice (1880–1959), New Zealand cricketer
 Susan Brice, Canadian politician
 Thomas Brice (martyrologist) (1536–1571), Church of England clergyman, martyrologist and poet 
 William Brice (1921–2008), American artist and abstract painter
 William Brice (ethnographer), (1921–2007), British ethnographer and linguist
 William O. Brice (1898–1972), American Marine Corps General and a veteran of the Korean war

Characters
 Wee-Bey Brice and son Namond Brice, characters on the HBO drama The Wire
 Tom Brice, a character in Across the Continent

Places
 Brice, Indiana, a village in the United States
 Brice, Ohio, a village in Franklin County, Ohio, United States
 Mount Brice, a mountain west of Mount Abrams in the Behrendt Mountains

Saint-Brice
 Saint-Brice, Charente, a commune in the Charente department in southwestern France
 Saint-Brice, Gironde, a commune in the Gironde department in Aquitaine in southwestern France
 Saint-Brice, Manche, a commune in the Manche department in Normandy in north-western France
 Saint-Brice, Mayenne, a commune in the Mayenne department in north-western France 
 Saint-Brice, Orne, a commune in the Orne department in north-western France 
 Saint-Brice, Seine-et-Marne, a commune in the Seine-et-Marne department in the Île-de-France region in north-central France

See also
 
 
 Bryce (disambiguation)

it:Danaidi#Nomi